Cefn Mawr Rangers Football Club is a Welsh football team based in Cefn Mawr, in the community of Cefn within the County Borough of Wrexham, Wales.  The team last played in the North East Wales Football League Premier Division, which is at the fourth tier of the Welsh football league system.

History
The club was established in 2016 and played in the North East Wales League, finishing third and gaining promotion to the Welsh National League (Wrexham Area).  The club had planned to play in the North East Wales Football League Premier Division for the 2022–23 season but resigned from the league in July 2022.

Honours

Welsh National League (Wrexham Area) Division One – Runners-up: 2018-19
North East Wales FA Junior (Horace Wynne) Cup – Winners: 2016–17

External links
Club official Twitter
Club official Facebook

References

Football clubs in Wales
North East Wales Football League clubs
Association football clubs established in 2016
2016 establishments in Wales